These are the official results of the Men's High Jump event at the 1999 IAAF World Championships in Athletics in Seville, Spain. There were a total number of 31 participating athletes, with two qualifying groups and the final held on Monday 23 August 1999.

Medalists

Schedule
All times are Central European Time (UTC+1)

Abbreviations
All results shown are in metres

Results

Qualifying round
Held on Saturday 21 August 1999

Qualification: Qualifying Performance 2.29 (Q) or at least 12 best performers (q) advance to the final.

Final

References
 IAAF
 trackandfieldnews
 Full results

H
High jump at the World Athletics Championships